The Jet Black's was an instrumental rock band from São Paulo, Brazil. The band was formed in 1961 (as "The Vampires") by Jurandi (drums), Orestes (rhythm guitar), Ernestico (saxophone), and José Paulo (bass), and Cat/Gato (guitar-solo and organ) joined the following year. Their first single was "Apache"/"Kon-Tiki", followed by "Hully-Gully" (1962), and "Twist/The Jet Black's Again" (1963).

Cat (Gato) left the group in 1966, and the other members became purely a house band for Continental Records.

History

First years
The band was formed in São Paulo in 1961 by guitarist Joe Primo (Primo Moreschi) and guitarist Bobby de Carlo. Initially, its name was The Vampires, in 1961, however, it was changed to the current one, in honor of the English group Shadows, whose one of the biggest hits was the song "Jet Black". In addition to Shadows, the group's influence was also the American group Ventures. Both had as basic repertoire rocks and instrumental twists performed for balls.

In 1962, they signed with Chantecler and released their first album, a 78 rpm, on which they performed two covers by The Shadows: "Apache" and "Kon-Tiki". With the success of the debut, the label invested in the group with the release of two LPs. The first, released in the same year, was "Twist", and the second was recorded the following year, "The Jet Black's Again – Twist".

Success
Throughout the 1960s, it was one of the most requested bands for concerts and recordings by performers such as Celly Campelo, Ronnie Cord, Roberto Carlos, Sérgio Reis and other stars of the Jovem Guarda. It was one of the bands that had the most participation in the Jovem Guarda program. In 1965, they began to make vocal recordings and released the LP "The Jet Black's", which would highlight the re-recording of the American rock classic "Suzie Q", by Dale Hawkins. In the same year, they recorded what would be their biggest success: "Theme for Young Lovers", version for "Theme for Young Lovers", released in a single that also included "Suzie Q".

In 1968, the group recorded the album "O Quente" with singer Reginaldo Rossi. In the same year, the German guitarist went to the United States and the composer and arranger Osvaldo Luís Posi and the keyboardist Renato Mendes join the band. With this new line-up, The Jet Black's records the album "Sempre", this was the band's last studio album recorded in the 60s, which marked by leaving Rock and roll and going to Rock pop.

With the decline of the Jovem Guarda, at the end of the 1960s, the group went into crisis with various formations, always around Jurandi. In the 1970s, it fell into ostracism and ended its activities, only resumed at the beginning of the following decade, with the revitalization of rock in Brazil.

Band return
In 1982, the remnants of the group, Jurandi and Guilherme, signed with Som Livre and released the LP "Rides Again". from 1960. In 1998, Douglas Dotta, son of Guilherme, resumed the group's work. They participated in the celebrations referring to the 30 years of Jovem Guarda, re-recording "Apache" for the CD box "30 anos da Jovem Guarda", launched by PolyGram, in 1995.

In 2003, with a new lineup, the group released the album "The Jet Black's Instrumental", which would mark the group's new return to activities. However, on 13 July 2004, Jurandi Trindade – the only member who participated in all the formations – dies, and thus ends the legendary group's career.

Bibliography

 2011 – The jet Black's (By Edu Reis)

Discography

Studio albums

 1962 – Twist (Chantecler)
 1963 – The Jet Black's Again (Chantecler)
 1963 – Other Famous Twists (Chantecler)
 1964 – Hully Gully (Chantecler)
 1965 – Top Top Top (Chantecler)
 1966 – The Jet Black's (Chantecler)
 1967 – Temas de Sempre na Música Jovem (Chantecler)
 1968 – Sempre (Chantecler)
 1982 – Riders Again (Som Livre)
 1988 – Remember The Shadows e The Ventures (Brasidisc)
 1989 – Golden Hits of The 60s (Brasidisc)
 1993 – The Jet Black's no Cinema
 2003 – Instrumental

Compilation albums

 1989 – O Melhor de The Jet Black's
 1995 – 25 Sucessos de The Jet Black's
 1996 – The Classic Collection
 2002 – Disco de Ouro
 2005 – Grandes Nomes

Special albums

 1965 – A Rainha da Juventude (Meire Pavão and The Jet Black's)
 1966 – Meire (Meire Pavão and The Jet Black's)
 1966 – Juventude em Sucessos
 1995 – 30 da Jovem Guarda

Legacy
The Jet Black's is considered one of the most important bands in Brazilian rock, and the band that helped shape Rock pop in the country, being one of the most famous bands in Instrumental rock, the style in which the band began to be successful, in 1964 they started to bring songs with lyrics, influencing artists that were starting at the time. The band participated in several recordings, playing instrumental songs by various artists of the time, such as Roberto Carlos, Celly Campello, Ronnie Cord, Sérgio Reis, Meire Pavão and others.

See also

 Jovem Guarda

References

Brazilian rock music groups
Musical groups established in 1961
1961 establishments in Brazil